Wheelchair basketball at the 2022 ASEAN Para Games was held at Sritex Arena Sports Hall, Surakarta.

Medal summary

Medalists
Men

Women

Results

Men's tournament 3-on-3

Group stage

Final round

Bronze medal match

Gold medal match

Women's tournament 3-on-3

Group stage

Final round

Bronze medal match

Gold medal match

Men's tournament 5-on-5

Group stage

Final round

Bronze medal match

Gold medal match

Women's tournament 5-on-5

Group stage

Final round

Bronze medal match

Gold medal match

See also
Basketball at the 2021 Southeast Asian Games

References

External links
 Wheelchair basketball at Games Result System

2022 ASEAN Para Games
Wheelchair basketball at the ASEAN Para Games